The Guatemala national U-17 football team is the national under-17 football team of Guatemala and is controlled by the Federación Nacional de Fútbol de Guatemala.

Fixtures and recent results

The following is a list of match results from the previous 12 months, as well as any future matches that have been scheduled.

2023

Players

Current squad
The following 20 players have been called up for the 2023 Concacaf Men’s Under-17 Championship that will be held in Guatemala from February 11-26, 2023.

Tournament records

FIFA U-17 World Cup

CONCACAF U-17 championship record
 1983: Did not enter
 1985: First stage
 1987: Did not enter
 1988: First stage
 1991: First stage
 1992: First stage
 1994: Did not enter
 1996: First stage
 1999: Did not qualify (lost qualifying playoff)
 2001: Did not qualify
 2003: Fourth place Group A
 2005: Did not qualify
 2007: Did not qualify
 2009: Third place Group B (tournament interrupted)
 2011: Group stage
 2013: Quarter-finals
 2015: Group stage
 2017: Disqualified from qualification
 2019: Round of 16
 2023: Quarter-finals
 From 1983 until 1991, competition was U-16, not U-17
 In 2009 the tournament was interrupted due to the swine flu.

References

under-17
Central American national under-17 association football teams